George Adrain (born 12 April 1953) is a former Scottish international lawn bowler.

Personal life
George is from a famous bowling family, his father (Willie Adrain) and uncle also called (Willie) were both Scottish internationals. He started bowling aged 14 in early 1968 after being introduced to the sport by his father.

Bowls career
George won the Scottish Triples in 1974 and British Triples in 1975. His biggest achievement came in the 1984 World Outdoor Championships in Aberdeen but bizarrely it was representing the United States. Jim Candelet fell ill during the competition leaving Skippy Arculli without a partner so Adrain the Scottish reserve took his place and the pair went on to win the Gold Medal.

He won two gold medals for Scotland however when he partnered Grant Knox to win the Pairs Gold at the 1986 Commonwealth Games in Edinburgh and was part of the fours team at the 1990 Commonwealth Games in Auckland, New Zealand. The team consisted of Denis Love, Ian Bruce and Willie Wood.

He was also part of the triples team that took Gold at the 1996 World Outdoor Championships. His clubs were the Dreghorn (Outdoors) and Irvine (Indoors).

He also won the Scottish National Bowls Championships triples title in 1974 and the pairs title in 1997 and 2002. In 1985, he won the Hong Kong International Bowls Classic singles title, in addition to winning two pairs titles in 1985 and 1986.

References

Scottish male bowls players
1953 births
Living people
Bowls World Champions
Commonwealth Games medallists in lawn bowls
Commonwealth Games gold medallists for Scotland
Bowls players at the 1986 Commonwealth Games
Bowls players at the 1990 Commonwealth Games
Medallists at the 1986 Commonwealth Games
Medallists at the 1990 Commonwealth Games